The Santo Domingo greenbelt (Spanish: Cinturon Verde de Santo Domingo) is a greenbelt project that surrounds the outer boundaries of the capital of the Dominican Republic, Santo Domingo de Guzman (Distrito Nacional).  Most of the greenbelt is located in the Santo Domingo Province which encloses and surrounds the National District (DN). The greenbelt makes part of a project to protect parklands around the capital.  It is divided into 8 protected zones:

Santo Domingo Greenbelt Zones
A.Rio Haina(Haina River Area)
B.Arroyo Guzman(Guzman Stream)
C.Arroyo Manzano(Manzano Stream)
D.Rio Isabela(Isabela River Area)
E.Rio Ozama(Ozama River Area)
F.Los Humedales
G.Arroyo Cachon(Cachon Stream)
H.Zona Oriental(Oriental Zone)

Endangerment
Many zones that are protected are being affected by over-urbanization and lack of law enforcement. Most of the poor population in the D.N live in the surroundings of Ozama River and Isabela River which causes pollution problem and lack of control. As a result, much of the project today is in danger for the exception of a few parts. Arroyo Manzano is increasingly being sub-urbanized due to population pressure.

References

Further reading
Cinturon Verda, Terra Dominicana
Cinturon Verde de Santo Domingo, PDF

Geography of Santo Domingo
Green belts
Geography of Santo Domingo Province
Protected areas of the Dominican Republic